Lupicinus ( 368–377) was a Roman army officer in late antiquity who served under the emperors Valentinian I and Valens. He distinguished himself in the  fighting the Alemanni in 368. He was serving as a military tribune in Pannonia in 376.

Lupicinus was serving as the commander of Roman troops in the diocese of Thrace in c. 377 during the events which resulted in the Gothic War. There he oversaw the settlement of the Goths within the empire along the Lower Danube, after which, he and the  Maximus foolishly proceeded to extort and starve them. At one point, they slaughtered dogs and offered them to the starving tribes at the price of 1 boy to be sold into slavery for 1 dog. Famished and humiliated, the Goths broke into an open revolt that led to the Gothic War of 376 and the catastrophic Battle of Adrianople in which the emperor Valens was killed.

After orchestrating a failed assassination attempt of the Gothic leaders while ostensibly meeting with them to discuss a peace, Lupicinus led his troops into a total defeat at the Battle of Marcianople. It was said that Lupicinus' actions in the battle were both foolish and cowardly. He was apparently superseded by new commanders in 377. It is unknown if Lupicinus was cashiered, executed or killed in subsequent battles. His actions directly and dynamically showed that the Roman Empire was declining.

References 
 
 
 

4th-century Romans
Comites rei militaris